Trevor Johnson may refer to:

Trevor Johnson (American football) (born 1981), American football defensive end
Trevor Johnson (historian) (born 1929), British historian; see Robert W. Scribner
Trevor Johnson (ice hockey) (born 1982), Canadian-born Italian ice hockey player
Trevor Johnson (designer), English graphic designer
Trevor Johnson (footballer) (1935–2016), former Australian rules football player
Trevor Johnson (curler) (born 1998), Canadian curler

See also
Trevor Johnston, Australian linguist